Allison Beth Adler (born May 30, 1967) is a Canadian-American television producer and writer. She is the co-creator of Supergirl and The New Normal, and is also known for her work on Chuck and Family Guy.

Early life
Adler was born in Montreal, Quebec, Canada, to a Jewish family. Her grandfather and father were Holocaust survivors from Romania. They later became American citizens.

Career 
Adler began her career by working on a TV series named Veronica's Closet in 1997. From 2001 to 2002, Adler produced 13 episodes of Family Guy and 16 episodes of Just Shoot Me!; she was supervising producer for nine episodes of Still Standing. She was co-executive producer on various shows, including Life As We Know It, Women of a Certain Age, and Emily's Reasons Why Not.

Adler produced Chuck as co-executive and executive producer from 2007 to 2010. Adler then joined the ABC series No Ordinary Family in May 2010 and in 2011 became a part of Glees writing team starting with the third season. She and Glee creator Ryan Murphy co-created The New Normal, which she worked on until it was cancelled in May 2013.

In 2015, Adler co-created Supergirl with Greg Berlanti and Andrew Kreisberg. The drama based on Superman's female cousin, Kara Zor-El. After two seasons, in 2017 Adler left Supergirl full-time to join The CW's reboot of Dynasty and sign a development deal with CBS Television Studios.

Personal life 
From 2001 to 2011, Adler was in a relationship with actress Sara Gilbert.  They have two children—a son, Levi Hank, born to Adler in October 2004, and a daughter, Sawyer Jane, born to Gilbert in August 2007. In August 2011, Gilbert announced that she and Adler had separated amicably.

In 2013, Adler began dating producer and writer Liz Brixius. The couple got engaged in November 2014. They broke up in May 2017.

References

External links 
 

1967 births
Living people
American television writers
Jewish American writers
American lesbian writers
Lesbian Jews
LGBT people from California
Television producers from California
American women television producers
American women television writers
Canadian LGBT screenwriters
LGBT television producers
Lesbian screenwriters
Screenwriters from California
Writers from Montreal
Canadian emigrants to the United States
Showrunners
American LGBT screenwriters
20th-century American women writers
21st-century American women writers
21st-century American Jews
Canadian lesbian writers
21st-century Canadian LGBT people
20th-century American screenwriters
21st-century American screenwriters